Dikkenek is a 2006 Franco-Belgian comedy film directed by Olivier Van Hoofstadt. It has attained cult status in France and Belgium because of its Belgian-type humor. It follows the life of different characters for a few days under the pretense of Stef & J.C. looking for the love of Stef's life. The title  comes from the Flemish words  and  verbatim for 'fat' + 'neck' and figuratively means an arrogant boaster.

Cast 
 Jean-Luc Couchard - Jean-Claude
 Dominique Pinon - Stef
 Marion Cotillard - Nadine
 Mélanie Laurent - Natacha
 Jérémie Renier - Greg
 Catherine Jacob - Sylvie
 Florence Foresti - Laurence
 François Damiens - Claudy
 Marie Kremer - Fabienne
 Catherine Hosmalin - Mich's wife

References

External links 

2006 films
2006 comedy films
Belgian comedy films
French comedy films
Films set in Belgium
Belgium in fiction
Films set in Brussels
2000s French-language films
French-language Belgian films
2000s French films